Dünya Yalan Söylüyor (The World is Telling Lies) is the fourth studio album of Turkish alternative rock band Mor ve Ötesi. It was released in 2004, and it has sold over 250,000 copies in Turkey.

Track listing
 "Yardım Et"– 5:35
 "Cambaz"– 3:50
 "Bir Derdim Var"– 3:34
 "Re"– 3:39
 "Sevda Çiçeği"– 4:00
 "Serseri"– 3:34
 "Aşk İçinde" – 4:01
 "Az Çok"– 2:39
 "Son Deneme"– 3:17 
 "Uyan"- 27:26

Hidden Track
The album contains a hidden song: After the last song, on the same track, there are several minutes of silence, and then an extended instrumental version of Bir Derdim Var. 
This technique is similar to what Alanis Morissette did on Jagged Little Pill.

Personnel
 Harun Tekin – vocals and rhythm guitar
 Kerem Kabadayı – drums
 Burak Güven – bass
 Kerem Özyeğen – lead guitar
 Ozan Tügen – keyboard, cümbüş
 Şebnem Ferah – guest vocals on "Yardım Et"

References 

2004 albums
Mor ve Ötesi albums